Bharya is a 1962 Malayalam language film starring Sathyan and Ragini in the lead roles. It was directed by Kunchacko based on a novel with the same title by Kanam EJ.

The novel was based on the controversial Thiruvalla Ammalu murder case. Ponkunnam Varkey wrote the dialogue, which became a cult favourite among family audiences, and was subsequently released along with the soundtrack album. This was for the first time in Kerala and second time in South India that the dialogue was released as a separate gramophone record.

Cast

Sathyan as Benny
Rajasree as Gracy
Ragini as Leela
 Manavalan Joseph as Velayudhan
 Bahadoor as Mathan
 Nellikode Bhaskaran as Premsagar
 S. P. Pillai as Uthuppu
 Adoor Pankajam as Uthuppu's Wife
 Kottayam Chellappan
 Namboori Mathew
 Sadanandan
 Jijo
 R.Gopalakrishnan as Joey
 K. S. Gopinath
 Piravam Mary
 Baby Seetha

Soundtrack

References

External links

Bharya

1962 films
1960s Malayalam-language films
Films directed by Kunchacko
Films based on Indian novels
Films about Christianity